A lecture hall (or lecture theatre) is a large room used for instruction, typically at a college or university. Unlike a traditional classroom with a capacity normally between one and fifty, the capacity of lecture halls is usually measured in the hundreds. Lecture halls almost always have a pitched floor, so that those in the rear are sat higher than those at the front (i.e. tiered seating), allowing them to see the lecturer.  The importance of lecture halls is so significant that some schools of architecture have offered courses exclusively centered on their design.  The noted Boston architect Earl Flansburgh wrote numerous articles focusing on achieving efficacious lecture hall design.

Lecture halls differ from other types of learning spaces, seminar rooms in particular, in that they allow for little versatility in use, although they are no less flexible than, for example, chemistry laboratories.  Experimentation, group work, and other contemporary educational methods are not practicable in a lecture hall.  On the other hand, lecture halls are excellent for focusing the attention of a large group on a single point, either an instructor or an audio-visual presentation, and modern lecture halls often feature audio-visual equipment. A microphone and loudspeakers are common to help the lecturer be heard, and projection screens may be used for large displays.  The acoustic properties of lecture halls have been the subject of numerous international studies, some even antedating the use of electronic amplification.

Studies into the use of the lecture theatre teaching space have found that students sit in specific locations due to a range of factors; these include being noticed, addressing anxiety or an ability to focus. Personal and social factors are also thought to determine students’ lecture theatre seating choice and the resulting effects on attainment. Studies into the way students use the space indicate that peer group formation exerts a strong impact on attainment and engagement, with groups of similar ability sitting together.

References 

Educational facilities